Finn Johannesen (23 August 1907 – 27 December 1984) was a Norwegian footballer. He played in six matches for the Norway national football team from 1931 to 1933.

References

External links
 

1907 births
1984 deaths
Norwegian footballers
Norway international footballers
Place of birth missing
Association footballers not categorized by position